Moses Oruaze Dickson (born August 13, 1985) is a Nigerian lawyer, entrepreneur and philanthropist. He is the managing solicitor of TRIAX Solicitors; a Bayelsa State, Nigeria-based law firm. He is the founder of Goldcoast Developmental foundation.

Early life 
He was born on 13 August 1985 in Toru-Orua Town of Sagbama Local Government Area of Bayelsa State, Nigeria. Oruaze holds a distinction in Master of Law- LLM in International Commercial Law from the University of Bedfordshire, as well as a first degree, Law, and a Bachelors in Law from the Nigerian Law School.

Career 
Oruaze founded the Solalina Investment Group, a company with interest in various industries, including oil and gas. In 2017, Solalina Investment Limited, in conjunction with Canterbury Christ Church University UK, embarked on a £4000 research project on International investment agreements and economic development in Africa.

In October 2018, the Goldcoast foundation provided relief materials to women and children affected by the flood in the Niger Delta region and received a commendation from the Vice President, Prof. Yemi Osibanjo, during his visits to flood-affected states.

He spoke in support of women's rights, equal opportunities for women  and the use of technology by young professionals.

Publications

References

External links
Official Website

1985 births
Living people